Alexander Graham (born 28 April 1995) is an Australian swimmer. He competed in the men's 200 metre freestyle event at the 2017 World Aquatics Championships.

References

External links
 

1995 births
Commonwealth Games gold medallists for Australia
Commonwealth Games medallists in swimming
Living people
Australian male freestyle swimmers
Swimmers from Brisbane
Swimmers at the 2018 Commonwealth Games
World Aquatics Championships medalists in swimming
Medalists at the 2020 Summer Olympics
Olympic bronze medalists for Australia
Swimmers at the 2020 Summer Olympics
Olympic bronze medalists in swimming
Medalists at the FINA World Swimming Championships (25 m)
20th-century Australian people
21st-century Australian people
Medallists at the 2018 Commonwealth Games